Chauncy may refer to:

 Chauncy (album), by Jason Scheff, 1996
 Chauncy (name), including lists of people with the given name and surname 
 Chauncy School, a secondary school in Ware, Hertfordshire, England
 Nan Chauncy Award, an Australian children's literature award

See also
 Chauncey (disambiguation)
 Chauncey (name)
 Chauncy Jerome Jr  Shipwreck Site, in Long Branch City, New Jersey, U.S.
 MV Chauncy Maples, motor ship and former steamship